Hartlaub's duck (Pteronetta hartlaubii) is a dark chestnut-coloured duck of African forests. Formerly included in the paraphyletic "perching duck" assemblage, it was later moved to the dabbling duck assemblage. However, it is fairly distinct from the "typical" dabbling ducks, and is placed in the monotypic genus Pteronetta to reflect this.

Analysis of mtDNA sequences of the cytochrome b and NADH dehydrogenase subunit 2 genes suggests that it belongs into a very distinct clade—possibly a subfamily of its own—together with the blue-winged goose, another African species of waterfowl with uncertain affinities.

Disrtibution
Hartlaub's duck is resident in equatorial West and Central Africa, from Guinea and Sierra Leone east through Nigeria to South Sudan, and south to Gabon, Congo and Zaire.

This bird is named after the German naturalist Gustav Hartlaub.

References

External links
Duck Behavior & Habitat

Hartlaub's duck
Hartlaub's duck
Birds of Sub-Saharan Africa
Hartlaub's duck
Hartlaub's duck